The Basketball Bundesliga Best German Young Player (German: Bester Deutscher Nachwuchsspieler) is an annual Basketball Bundesliga award that goes to the league's most valuable player who is under age 22, and has German nationality. The award was handed out for the first time in the 2001–02 season, as the Rookie of the Year award.

Winners

References

External links
German League official website 

Basketball Bundesliga awards